Muna al-Sheemi (born 1968) is an Egyptian writer. She obtained a degree in archaeology from Cairo University, and currently works as a history teacher. She has published more than half a dozen works of fiction, including novels and short stories. Her work has also been published in leading Arab newspapers and magazines such as Al-Watan, Akhbar al-Adab and Al-Arabi.

Her latest book The Size of a Grape was nominated for the 2015 Arabic Booker Prize. Previously she was awarded the Egyptian General Authority for Cultural Palaces Prize for her novel A Colour Runaway from the Rainbow and the Story Club Prize for her novel The Weightier Scale.

Publications

 A Colour Runaway from the Rainbow 
 The Weightier Scale 
 Jangling of the Bracelets
 The Size of a Grape

Awards and nominations 

 The Egyptian General Authority for Cultural Palaces Prize, 2004
 The Story Club Prize, 2004
 BBC Radio Prize, 2014

References

Egyptian women writers
1968 births
Cairo University alumni
Living people